The World Allround Speed Skating Championships for Men took place on 25 and 26 February 1984 in Gothenburg at the Ullevi outdoor stadium temporary ice rink.

Title holder was the Norwegian Rolf Falk-Larssen.

Classification

Source:

References

World Allround Speed Skating Championships, 1984
1984 World Allround

Attribution
In Dutch